Agios Sergios ( "Saint Sergius";  "New Bosporus", previously ) is a large village in Cyprus, near the ancient site Salamis. Agios Sergios is de facto under control of Northern Cyprus. , it had a population of 3,347.

Demographics
In 1946, 1,790 people were living in Agios Sergios; 82 were Turkish Cypriots and the rest Greek Cypriots. All Turkish Cypriots fled to Famagusta and neighbouring villages in 1958. By 1973, Agios Sergios had an estimated population of 2,040. After 1974, it was reinhabited by some of its former Turkish Cypriot residents, displaced Turkish Cypriots from the south of Cyprus, and Turkish settlers from Istanbul and Trabzon.

International relations
In 2013, Yeni Boğaziçi became an international Cittaslow member, the first in the whole of Cyprus.

Twin towns – sister cities

Yeni Boğaziçi is twinned with:
  Altınova, Turkey
  Zabrat, Azerbaijan – since 2005

References

External links
 

Communities in Famagusta District
Populated places in Gazimağusa District
Municipalities of Northern Cyprus
Cittaslow